Katkai is a village located in Ateli tehsil, Mahendragarh district, Haryana, India. It is on the Ateli–Mahendergarh road and is 6 kilometres from Ateli and 20  kilometres from Mahendergarh. Katkai, a village of wrestlers and sports persons. The village has a Govt school up to Middle Class with a certain playground for villagers. Medical facilities are available in Ateli city. Presenty Sarpanch is Mrs. Chauhan since 2016 to till now. The population of the village is more than 1800 in which 52% males and 48% females, about 58% are the youngers below age 35, 28% are adults age between 35 and 60, and 14% are senior above age 60. Most people are involved in agricultural activities to earn.

Villages in Mahendragarh district
Villages in Ateli tehsil